Pandora Airport  is an airport serving the village of Pandora in Limón Province, Costa Rica. There is a large hill just north of the runway.

See also

 Transport in Costa Rica
 List of airports in Costa Rica

References

External links
 OurAirports - Pandora
 OpenStreetMap - Pandora
 FallingRain - Pandora

Airports in Costa Rica
Limón Province